Loxozus is a genus of cactus flies in the family Neriidae.

Distribution
Colombia, Bolivia.

Species
Loxozus clavicornis Enderlein, 1922

References

Brachycera genera
Taxa named by Günther Enderlein
Neriidae
Diptera of South America